Asyneuma is a genus of flowering plants in the bellflower family, Campanulaceae. They are native to North Africa and Eurasia. Many are endemic to Turkey. Plants of the genus may be known commonly as harebells, but this name can also apply to the entire family. There are up to about 33 species.

Characters used to identify Asyneuma species include a generally wheel-shaped (rotate) corolla with the petals fused at the bases and spreading outward into very narrow lobes, lacking or rudimentary appendages on the calyx, a stigma with 2 to 4 lobes, and an oblong or roughly spherical fruit capsule that breaks open via pores on the sides. These characters are not always helpful in distinguishing Asyneuma from the closely related genus Campanula, because authors disagree on which character is more important: the extent to which the flower petals are joined versus the position of the pores on the fruit capsule. Molecular data has been required to determine the best genus in which to place certain species.

Species include:
 Asyneuma amplexicaule (Willd.) Hand.-Mazz. - Turkey, Iran, Iraq, Caucasus
 Asyneuma anthericoides   (Janka) Bornm. - Balkans 
 Asyneuma argutum  (Regel) Bornm. - Central Asia
 Asyneuma babadaghense  Yildiz & Kit Tan - Turkey
 Asyneuma campanuloides (M.Bieb. ex Sims) Bornm. - Caucasus
 Asyneuma canescens (Waldst. & Kit.) Griseb. & Schenk - Balkans, Ukraine
 Asyneuma chinense D.Y.Hong - Guangxi, Guizhou, Hubei, Sichuan, Yunnan
 Asyneuma compactum Damboldt - Turkey
 Asyneuma davisianum  Yildiz & Kit Tan - Turkey
 Asyneuma ekimianum Yildiz & Kit Tan - Turkey
 Asyneuma filipes  (Nábelek) Damboldt - Turkey, Iraq
 Asyneuma fulgens  (Wall.) Briq. - Indian Subcontinent, Tibet, Myanmar
 Asyneuma giganteum (Boiss.) Bornm. - Greek Islands
 Asyneuma ilgazense Yildiz & Kit Tan - Turkey
 Asyneuma isauricum  Contandr., Quézel & Pamukç - Turkey
 Asyneuma japonicum (Miq.) Briq. - Japan, Korea, Manchuria, Russian Far East
 Asyneuma junceum  Parolly - Turkey
 Asyneuma limonifolium (L.) Janch. - Balkans, Italy, Turkey
 Asyneuma linifolium   (Boiss. & Heldr.) Bornm. - Turkey
 Asyneuma lobelioides  (Willd.) Hand.-Mazz. - Turkey, Caucasus
 Asyneuma lycium  (Boiss.) Bornm. - Turkey
 Asyneuma macrodon    (Boiss. & Hausskn.) Bornm. - Iran
 Asyneuma michauxioides  (Boiss.) Damboldt - Turkey
 Asyneuma persicum  (A.DC.) Bornm. - Turkey, Iraq, Iran
 Asyneuma pulchellum   (Fisch. & C.A.Mey.) Bornm.- Turkey, Iraq, Iran, Caucasus
 Asyneuma pulvinatum  P.H.Davis - Turkey
 Asyneuma rigidum  (Willd.) Grossh. - Algeria, Caucasus, Turkey, Iran, Iraq, Lebanon, Sinai, Syria 
 Asyneuma thomsonii (C.B.Clarke) Bornm. - western Himalayas
 Asyneuma trichocalycinum (Boiss.) Bornm. - Turkey
 Asyneuma trichostegium (Boiss.) Bornm. - Turkey
 Asyneuma virgatum  (Labill.) Bornm. - Greek Islands, Turkey, Iran, Caucasus, Syria

References

Campanuloideae
Campanulaceae genera